The Godfrey–Milliken Bill, also called the American Liberty and Democratic Solidarity (Loyalty) Act, was a private member's bill introduced in the Canadian parliament by Liberal MPs Peter Milliken and John Godfrey.  The bill was intended as a parody of the American Helms–Burton Act.

The Helms–Burton Act set up stringent punishments on any business or person that profited from property of American businesses and people that had been seized in the Cuban Revolution.  The bill included a policy of punishing foreign nations and companies who had profited from this seized property (which in practice means trading with Cuba at all, since everything in Cuba is in some way connected to such property). This included a number of Canadian companies.

The 1996 bill responded by calling for descendants of United Empire Loyalists who fled the American Revolution to be able to reclaim land and property that was confiscated by the American government. The bill would have also allowed the Canadian government to exclude corporate officers, or controlling shareholders of companies that possess property formerly owned by Loyalists, as well as the spouse and minor child of such persons from entering Canada. In total some three million Canadians are descendants of United Empire Loyalists, including Milliken and Godfrey.  The current value of the land and property seized during the American Revolution is many billions of dollars.

The bill received widespread attention in Canada and also some publicity in the United States, including a feature on 60 Minutes.

The Godfrey–Milliken Bill did not become law. Milliken later supported Bill C-54 to amend the Foreign Extraterritorial Measures Act which effectively neutralized any attempt to enforce the Helms–Burton Act on Canadians or Canadian companies. The amendments blocked access to Canadian records for the prosecution of any case under the Helms–Burton Act, allowed the Attorney General to block Canadian courts from enforcing judgments emanating from US jurisdictions against Canadian defendants, permitted Canadian defendants to counter-sue in Canadian courts, and imposed a $1.5 million fine (equivalent to $ million in ) to any Canadian entity that aided any prosecution under Helms–Burton.

See also

 Canada–Cuba relations
 Canada–Caribbean relations
 Canada–Latin America relations
 Cuban Canadian
 Foreign relations of Canada
 Foreign relations of Cuba
 United States embargo against Cuba

References

External links
  The text of the Godfrey-Milliken Bill (C-339)*  The text of Bill C-54
  Parliamentary record of John Godfrey's co-sponsorship of C-54
The Godfrey–Milliken Bill – A Canadian response to the Helms–Burton Law, Sam Boskey, October 29, 1996

1996 in Canadian law
Proposed laws of Canada
Boycotts of Cuba
35th Canadian Parliament
Canada–Cuba relations
Canada–United States relations